WestJet Link is a brand name under which Pacific Coastal Airlines operates feeder flights for WestJet. Service was originally planned to commence March 7, 2018, but was delayed until June 21, 2018. The brand was created to primarily connect smaller cities in western Canada with WestJet's domestic hubs at Calgary International Airport and Vancouver International Airport and stimulate air travel in smaller markets.

Destinations

WestJet Link connects the WestJet mainline service with 10 Destinations in British Columbia and Alberta. All flights operate into or out of Calgary International Airport or Vancouver International Airport.

Operators and fleet

All WestJet Link flights are operated by Pacific Coastal using its fleet of 34-seat Saab 340 aircraft. The aircraft operating for Link are painted in the 2015-2018 WestJet livery, with the word "Link" to the right of the logo. As of October 2020, Pacific Coastal Airlines had 3 Saab 340s painted and operating for WestJet Link.

See also

 List of WestJet destinations
 WestJet Encore

References

External links 
 Pacific Coastal website fleet
 WestJet website fleet

Canadian companies established in 2017
Regional airline brands
WestJet
Airlines established in 2017
Canadian brands
2017 establishments in Alberta
Companies based in Calgary